The Chen Jhong-he Memorial Hall is a memorial hall dedicated to Chen Jhong-he located in Lingya District, Kaohsiung, Taiwan.

History
In 1911, Chen Jhong-he used to be the richest man in Kaohsiung. He built a Western-style terrace which was completed in 1920 which then became the first private Western residence in the city. His descendants funded renovation to the building to commemorate him and then named the building as Chen Jhong-he Memorial Hall which is now open to public.

Architecture
The 2-story building was built in a European Renaissance style. However, the symmetrical layout of the main hall and patient's wards resembles traditional Taiwanese hospitals.

Transportation
The building is accessible within walking distance west from Sanduo Shopping District Station of Kaohsiung MRT.

See also
 List of tourist attractions in Taiwan
 Tomb of Chen Jhong-he

References

1920 establishments in Taiwan
Buildings and structures completed in 1920
Buildings and structures in Kaohsiung
Houses in Taiwan
Lingya District
Monuments and memorials in Taiwan